The Osgood Formation, also known as the Osgood Shale is a geologic formation in Indiana, Kentucky, and Ohio. It preserves fossils dating back to the Silurian period.

See also

 List of fossiliferous stratigraphic units in Indiana
 List of fossiliferous stratigraphic units in Kentucky
 List of fossiliferous stratigraphic units in Ohio

References

 
 Generalized Stratigraphic Chart for Ohio

Silurian Indiana
Silurian Kentucky
Silurian Ohio
Silurian southern paleotemperate deposits
Sheinwoodian